John Sutcliffe may refer to:

John B. Sutcliffe (1853–1913), English and American architect
John Willie Sutcliffe (1868–1947), association (Soccer), and rugby union footballer
John Sutcliffe (umpire) (born 1944), Australian football umpire
John Sutcliffe (footballer) (1913–1980), English footballer
John Sutcliffe (designer) (died 1987), British fashion designer and fetish photographer John Sutcliffe
John Sutcliffe (British politician) (born 1931), British Conservative Party politician, MP 1970–1974